Happy Landing is a 1934 American action film directed by Robert N. Bradbury and starring Ray Walker, Julie Bishop and William Farnum.

Cast
Ray Walker as Lt. Nick Terris
 Julie Bishop as Janet Curtis 
 William Farnum as Col. Curtis 
 Noah Beery as Capt. Terris 
 Hyram A. Hoover as Lt. Peter Taylor
 Morgan Conway as Frank Harland 
 Warner Richmond as Powell 
 Donald Reed as Paul 
 Billy Erwin as Horace 
 Ruth Romaine as Stella 
 Eddie Fetherston as Wireless Operator 
 Gertrude Simpson as Wife

References

Bibliography
 Stephen Pendo. Aviation in the Cinema. Scarecrow Press, 1985.

External links
 

1934 films
1930s action films
1930s English-language films
American action films
Films directed by Robert N. Bradbury
American black-and-white films
Monogram Pictures films
American aviation films
1934 drama films
1930s American films